British Serbs or Serbs in the United Kingdom are Serbs and people of Serbian ancestry in the United Kingdom.

Culture

Religion
There are a number of Serbian Orthodox churches in the UK, including London, Birmingham, Bradford, Halifax, Corby, Derby, Bedford, Telford, Leicester and Oxford.

Organisations
In 1953, an organisation which was to become the Movement of Serbian Chetniks of Ravna Gora in Great Britain was established by fifty prominent Dinara Division veterans from all over England and Wales and is still active.

The Serbian Society in the UK was formed in 1995 as a new influx of Serbian refugees and émigrés arrived amid the Yugoslav Wars of the 1990s. The society has a cultural focus in London. It is a registered charity.

The Serbian Council of Great Britain was established in 2004 to promote the development of the community, particularly through cooperation with exiting community organisations. Since 2008, the organisation has organised Serbian Week which would broaden to become Serbian Month. Typically a series of events held from late January through to the end of February, it has become the most successful exposition of culture of its kind within the Serbian Diaspora.

In 2008, a magazine was launched for Serbs in Britain and Ireland called Britić, which is now online.

Demographics
The Serbian Council of Britain notes the presence of second- and third-generation British Serbs. In 2001, the Serbian Embassy estimated that there were 70,000 Serbs in the United Kingdom. A January 2012 estimate claims 80,000.

The 2011 UK Census, recorded 8,049 Serbian-born residents in England, 122 in Wales, 188 in Scotland, and 32 in Northern Ireland (a total of 8,391). In response to the ethnicity question, 7,312 people in England, 106 in Wales, and 185 in Scotland wrote in "Serbian" under the "White" heading, as an alternative to ticking one of the pre-defined categories.

There has been a Serb community in Halifax since Yugoslavia's liberation during World War II. Monarchist refugees (Chetniks) left Yugoslavia as a result of Josip Broz Tito's revolution.

There is a sizeable Serb community in Shepherd's Bush (Hammersmith and Fulham) and Notting Hill (Kensington and Chelsea) in West London, where Serbian grocery stores, cafes, and a Serbian church is present.

Notable people

Arts and entertainment
 Pete Vuckovic, singer/songwriter
 Nenad Petrović, writer
 Roksanda Ilincic, fashion designer
 Deyan Sudjic, broadcaster, director of London's Design Museum, Order of the British Empire
 Sara Brajovic, model and actress
 Tamara Ecclestone, model and socialite
 Petra Ecclestone, model and socialite
 Cary Elwes, actor
 Damian Elwes, artist
 Cassian Elwes, film producer
 Tessa Kennedy, interior designer
 Lene Lovich, singer/songwriter
 Vesna Goldsworthy, author and poet
 Bobby Krlic, musician and producer
 Daniel Vivian, actor
 Zelda Tinska, actress
 Abby Rakic-Platt, actress
 Olivia Sudjic, novelist
 Vukša Veličković. journalist
 Ana Rajcevic, fashion artist
 Ana Šekularac, fashion designer

Academia
 Vlatko Vedral, professor of physics at University of Oxford
 Stevan K. Pavlowitch, historian
 Maja Pantic, professor and A.I. expert

Sports
 Alex Bogdanović, tennis player born in Belgrade
 John Lukic, former Arsenal and Leeds United goalkeeper
 Steve Ogrizovic, former Coventry City goalkeeper
 Milija Aleksic, former Tottenham goalkeeper
 Mel Pejic, former Stoke City defender
 Mike Pejic, former Everton defender
 Shaun Pejic, former Vancouver Whitecaps defender
 Simon Svabic, former professional rugby league footballer
 Liam Higgins, former professional rugby league footballer
 Marko Stanojevic, rugby union player

Other
 Milan Mandarić, businessman and owner of Sheffield Wednesday F.C.
 Nicolas Bratza, former President of the European Court of Human Rights
 Vane Ivanovic, diplomat
 Daška McLean
 Milos Stankovic, former British Army officer

See also

 Serbia – United Kingdom relations
 Serbian Orthodox Eparchy of Britain and Scandinavia
 List of Serbs
 List of Serbian Americans
 List of Serbian Canadians

References

Further reading

External links
 The Serbian Society in the UK
 The Serbian Council of Great Britain
 Saint Sava's Serbian Orthodox Church
 Projekat iz Dijaspore u Londonu: Mala biblioteka
 Projekat iz Dijaspore u Londonu: iBiblioteka

British people of Serbian descent
Serbia
Serbian Orthodox Church in the United Kingdom
United Kingdom
United Kingdom